Private Wings Flugcharter GmbH is a German charter airline that was founded in 1991 and operates chartered corporate, cargo and air ambulance services out of Berlin Brandenburg Airport. Its head office is located in the General Aviation Terminal (Allgemeine Luftfahrt) on the property of Berlin Brandenburg Airport in Schönefeld, Brandenburg.

Fleet 

As of May 2022, the Private Wings fleet consists of the following aircraft:

Accidents and incidents 
 On 19 February 1996 at 09:54 local time, a Private Wings Cessna Citation II (registered D-CASH) crashed near Freilassing, Germany, killing the two pilots and eight passengers on board. The aircraft was on an executive flight from Berlin Tempelhof Airport to Salzburg Airport and the pilots had already begun the final approach, when severe icing conditions were encountered, leading to a stall and subsequent crash of the aircraft into a forest  short of the runway. The accident investigation concluded that there was also a short circuit in the aircraft's electrical systems, which might have contributed to the crash.

References

External links 

Official website

Airlines of Germany
Airlines established in 1991
1991 establishments in Germany